Manfred Hinze (born 8 January 1933) is a German athlete. He competed in the men's triple jump at the 1960 Summer Olympics and the 1964 Summer Olympics.

References

External links
 

1933 births
Living people
Athletes (track and field) at the 1960 Summer Olympics
Athletes (track and field) at the 1964 Summer Olympics
German male triple jumpers
Olympic athletes of the United Team of Germany
Place of birth missing (living people)